Ungifted is a 2012 children's novel by Gordon Korman, which contains 31 chapters and 280 pages. The story is told with chapters of alternating perspectives. The plot revolves around Donovan Curtis, a troublemaker who gets wrapped up in a major prank gone wrong. Due to an accident caused by the superintendent, Donovan gets sent to the Academy of Scholastic Distinction (ASD), a school for gifted and talented students. The rest of the novel is spent on Donovan avoiding being caught while helping the students of ASD through his own special gifts. Donovan avoids getting caught by driving the class robot (shown on cover) providing a teacher ( his pregnant sister Katie) for Human Growth and Development class of which the students of ASD lack to prevent them from summer school. 

A television series adaptation is currently in the works and will air on Nickelodeon.

Plot
Donovan Curtis considers himself ungifted (the opposite of gifted). He is, instead, a prankster and troublemaker. One day, one of his pranks goes too far in causing a commotion. He strikes a statue which disrupts a basketball game. Although no one is injured, the gym is destroyed, with repairs for the damage that was done to the gym being prohibitively expensive. The district superintendent, Dr. Schultz, who was at the game, catches Donovan red-handed. However, after he jots down Donovan's name, his assistant thinks it is the list of candidates for the Academy for Scholastic Distinction (ASD), a school for extremely gifted students.

Donovan expects the mishap and his escape from punishment will eventually be discovered and feels that he will cause more stress to his already stressed household. His older sister, Katie, is currently staying with them and is seven months pregnant. Katie's husband Brad is a Marine who is deployed in Afghanistan. Adding to the pressure, Katie's mother-in-law leaves Brad's dog, Beatrice, who seems to be ill (but was later revealed to be pregnant) and only takes a liking to Donovan. However, after Donovan learns of the error that is sending him to ASD, he is filled with joy by the mistake.

On his first day, Donovan meets his classmates, and while some seem to be annoyed by him, some take a liking to him, especially Chloe, a girl interested in normal things. While Donovan continues to hide in the academy, his teachers wonder if he is gifted. Donovan joins Robotics, a class taught by his homeroom teacher Mr. Osborne ("Mr. Oz"). Donovan helps give their robot a name: Tin Man Metallica Squarepants. Donovan introduces his classmate Noah Youkilis, a skinny boy with a high IQ (206), to YouTube which proves to be addictive to Noah. Donovan also shows his classmates his talent controlling the robot with a joystick.

Eventually, Donovan learns his classmates will have to go to summer school for failing to take Human Growth and Development. To help them, he convinces his sister to teach his classmates, which eventually gets approved. Later, during a school dance at the academy, Donovan's Hardcastle friends, the two Daniels (Daniel Sanderson and Daniel Nussbaum), steal the robot. However, one of the perpetrators is thrashed by Noah, who had learned of professional wrestling via YouTube.

A little bit later, Donovan is told to go to the library to take a test, to which he feels nervous because if he fails it he could be kicked out. However, while taking the test, Donovan discovers that someone had hacked the computer and was taking the test for him. For this Ms.Bevelaqua interviews Donovan's classmates about the test. While interviewing Noah Youkilis she says that they could get expelled for cheating on the test. 

Later, as the team prepares for the robotics tournament, Dr. Schultz finds a video from Noah's YouTube channel “Youkilicious” and recognizes Donovan as the boy who destroyed the gym. He goes to Academy to Donovan's classroom and tells him that he's been expelled.

People/Characters

 Donovan Curtis
 Abigail Lee
 Noah Youkilis
 Chloe Garfinkle
 The Daniels
 Katie Patterson
 Brad Patterson
 Tina Mandy Patterson (Katie and Brad's baby)
 Ms.Bevelaqua
 Heather
 Deidre  
 Beatrice (the dog)
 Tin Man (the robot)
 Mr.Osborne
 Dr.Schultz
 James Donovan (Donovan's dead relative)

Awards and achievements 
 Winner of the 2014 Red Cedar Award (BC Young Readers' Choice)
 Short-listed for the 2015 Pacific Northwest Library Association Young Readers' Choice
 Short-listed for the 2013 Snow Willow Award (Saskatchewan Young Readers' Choice)
 Short-listed for the 2013 Canadian Library Association Book of the Year For Children
 Runner-up of the 2014 Manitoba Young Readers' Choice Award
 Commended for the 2013 Oregon Library Association Best 2020 Readers Award
 Commended for the 2013 Best Books for Kids and Teens, Canadian Children's Book Centre

Reception 
Ungifted has received reviews from School Library Journal, Voice of Youth Advocates (VOYA), ALA Booklist, the National Post, Publishers Weekly, New York Times Book Review, the Horn Book Guide, Children's Literature, Junior Library Guild, and Kirkus Reviews. School Library Journal described the story as "unpretentious and universally appealing". Booklist labelled the conclusion as "satisfying". New York Times wrote that the novel is "brisk, heartfelt and timely". Children's Literature described the story as "unique" and the novel as "easily read", "nice" and "safe". Children's Lit also recommended it for "middle school students who don't feel they belong" and as an "ideal selection for classroom study" with "well-developed" characters and "many layers of 'drama'". Voice Of Young Advocates praised the novel by describing Ungifted as "humorous", "quirky", and "feel-good". The novel was also praised as "a gem for readers looking for a story", and the plot as "touching, without being overly sentimental". VOYA recommended Ungifted for "middle school readers who are looking for a funny and quick read".

References

External links

2014 American novels
Novels by Gordon Korman
American children's novels
Novels set in elementary and primary schools
2014 children's books
Balzer + Bray books